The 2014 Minnesota Golden Gophers football team represented the University of Minnesota in the 2014 NCAA Division I FBS football season. They were led by fourth-year head coach Jerry Kill and played their home games at TCF Bank Stadium. They were a member of the West Division of the Big Ten Conference. They finished the season 8–5, 5–3 in Big Ten play to finish in a tie for second place in the West Division. They were invited to the Citrus Bowl where they lost to Missouri. It was their first New Year's Day bowl game appearance in 53 years, their previous was the 1962 Rose Bowl.

Preseason
Heading into their fourth off-season, Jerry Kill's coaching staff at Minnesota suffered their first departure as linebackers and assistant head coach Bill Miller accepted the linebackers coach position at Florida State.  After a brief coaching search, the Gophers named Mike Sherels the new linebackers coach. Sherels had an extensive history with the University of Minnesota, playing middle linebacker for the team from 2003-2007 and then serving as a special assistant and then defensive graduate assistant under Jerry Kill from 2011-2013.

The Gophers also saw quarterback Philip Nelson leave the team, announcing his transfer to Rutgers University shortly after the conclusion of the 2013 season. During the off season, Nelson was charged with first-degree assault after allegedly kicking Isaac Kolstad in the head during a late-night scuffle in downtown Mankato, Minnesota. These charges led to Nelson's dismissal from the Rutgers Scarlet Knights football program on May 14, 2014.

Personnel

Schedule

Source: Schedule

Game summaries

Eastern Illinois

Middle Tennessee

TCU

San Jose State

Michigan

    
    
    
    
    
    
    
    

David Cobb 32 Rush, 183 Yds

Northwestern

Purdue

Illinois

Iowa

Ohio State

Nebraska

Wisconsin

Citrus Bowl

Rankings

Players Drafted into the NFL

References

Minnesota
Minnesota Golden Gophers football seasons
Minnesota Golden Gophers football